The Hello Girls is a British comedy-drama that originally aired on BBC One for two series from 5 September 1996 to 13 August 1998. It was inspired by the novel Switchboard Operators written by Carol Lake. The series is set in and around the Derby telephone exchange during 1959 and 1961 respectively.

The Hello Girls was launched with much promotion aimed around former EastEnders actress Letitia Dean, who played Chris Cross, one of the 'girls' who worked at the telephone exchange. It performed very well in the ratings for both series.

The theme tune Busy Line is performed by the main cast (known as 'The Teletones' in the programme).

Each episode is 30 minutes in duration.

Main cast
Letitia Dean – Chris Cross
Amy Marston – Sylvia Sands
Helen Sheals – Ronnie Ferrari
Stephanie Turner – Miss Armitage
Maggie McCarthy – Miss Marriott
Samantha Seager - Val Pepper (Latimer in Series 2)
Kate Lonergan – Pam Heath
Beverley Klein – Fanny Fanshaw
Mark Aiken - Dave Curtis
Martin O'Brien - Johnny
Colin Wells - Dick Mandeville

Episode guide

Series One

1. First Day (5 September 1996)
2. Saturday Shift (12 September 1996)
3. The Teletones (19 September 1996)
4. Listening In (26 September 1996)
5. Baslow 212 (3 October 1996)
6. The Occasion Cake (10 October 1996)
7. The Emergency Call (17 October 1996)
8. Miss GPO Personality 1959 (24 October 1996)

Series Two

1. Work To Rule (25 June 1998)
2. The Pools (2 July 1998) (5.06m)
3. Down Under (9 July 1998) (6.01m)
4. Secret Admirer (16 July 1998) (5.37m)
5. Fever (23 July 1998) (6.16m)
6. Cupids Arrow (30 July 1998) (6.51m)
7. The Perfect Joy (6 August 1998) (5.90m)
8. Walking Back To Happiness (13 August 1998) (6.75m)

The show was directed by both Dermot Boyd and Richard Laxton

References

External links
  Viewing Figures information retrieved 12 August 2009
 

1990s British comedy-drama television series
1996 British television series debuts
1998 British television series endings
BBC Television shows
Television series set in the 1950s
Television series set in the 1960s
English-language television shows
Hello Girls